Montara is an album by American jazz vibraphonist Bobby Hutcherson recorded in 1975 and released on the Blue Note label.

Reception 
The Allmusic review by Thom Jurek awarded the album 4 stars stating "Montara is one of the great feel-good jazz albums of the 1970s, one of the great Latin jazz albums of the 1970s, and one of the great groove jazz records. Seek it out without hesitation".

Track listing 
All compositions by Bobby Hutcherson except as indicated
 "Camel Rise" (George Cables) - 5:35
 "Montara" - 4:58
 "La Malanga (Se Acabo)" (Rudy Calzado) - 4:17
 "Love Song" (Cables) - 5:37
 "Little Angel" (Eddie Martinez) - 3:54
 "Yuyo" - 6:42
 "Oye Como Va" (Tito Puente) - 5:08
Recorded at The Record Plant, Los Angeles, California on August 12–14, 1975.

Personnel 
 Bobby Hutcherson - vibes, marimba
 Oscar Brashear, Blue Mitchell - trumpet
 Plas Johnson - flute
 Ernie Watts, Fred Jackson, Jr. - tenor saxophone, flute
 Eddie Cano - piano
 Larry Nash - electric piano
 Dennis Budimir - guitar
 Chuck Domanico, Dave Troncoso - bass
 Harvey Mason - drums
 Bobby Matos, Johnny Paloma, Victor Pantoja, Ralph MacDonald, Willie Bobo, Rudy Calzado - percussion
 Dale Oehler - arranger

References 

Blue Note Records albums
Bobby Hutcherson albums
1975 albums